Anthony Thomas Smith QC (21 June 1935 – 15 September 2017) was a British lawyer and Liberal Party politician.

Background
Smith was born the son of Sydney Ernest Smith and Winston Victoria Smith. He was educated at Northampton, Stafford, and Hinckley Grammar Schools and King's College, Cambridge, (Exhibnr; MA). In 1959 he married Letitia Ann Wheldon Griffith. They had one son and two daughters.

Professional career
Smith was Called to the Bar by the Inner Temple in 1958. He served as a Flying Officer in the RAF from 1958 to 1960, then returned to his legal career. He was founder and Chairman of the Birmingham Free Representation Scheme. He was made a QC in 1977 and appointed as a Recorder. He was made a Bencher in 1985.

Political career
Smith was Liberal candidate for the Northampton division at the 1959 General Election. The constituency was a Labour/Conservative marginal and the Liberals had not run a candidate since coming a poor third in 1950. His prospects were not good and the party did not improve on its position.

Electoral record

References

1935 births
2017 deaths
Liberal Party (UK) parliamentary candidates
Alumni of King's College, Cambridge
Members of the Inner Temple
Place of birth missing
English King's Counsel
20th-century King's Counsel
21st-century King's Counsel
Royal Air Force officers